Luhrs Tower is an Art Deco skyscraper office building in Downtown Phoenix, Arizona. It is located at the southeast corner of First Avenue and Jefferson Street, on the south side of the former Patriots Square Park.

Architecture
The building was built in 1929 by George Luhrs Jr., a prominent local Phoenix native, Stanford Law School graduate, World War I US Army 2nd Lt., businessman, and son of George Luhrs Sr., Phoenix City Councilman from 1881 to 1885. The tower reaches a height of 185 ft (56 m). Luhrs Tower has 14 stories, with symmetrical setbacks at the 8th and 11th floors.

Luhrs Tower was designed in the Art Deco style by the architectural firm of Trost & Trost in El Paso, Texas. It bears a considerable resemblance to the firm's O. T. Bassett Tower located in El Paso. The design also features several elements of Eliel Saarinen's Tribune Tower design. A. F. Wasielewski Company of Phoenix was the general contractor.

Popular culture
The Luhrs Tower appeared in the background of a scene from the 1960 film Psycho in which the character Marion Crane (played by Janet Leigh) crossed the street with the deposit she was supposed to make for her boss.

See also
 Luhrs Building – built in 1924, adjacent to the Luhrs Tower.
 Art Deco architecture in Arizona
 Phoenix Historic Property Register
 List of historic properties in Phoenix

External links
 Emporis.com: Luhrs Tower

References 
Skyscraper office buildings in Phoenix, Arizona
Buildings and structures completed in 1929
Trost & Trost buildings
Art Deco architecture in Arizona